, prov. designation: , is a trans-Neptunian object from the Kuiper belt located in the outermost region of the Solar System. It was discovered on 23 September 1998, by American astronomer Arianna Gleason at the Kitt Peak National Observatory near Tucson, Arizona. It has a grey-blue color (BB) and a rotation period of 8.8 hours. , it has not been named.

Orbit and classification 

 orbits the Sun at a distance of 36.5–39.7 AU once every 234 years and 9 months (85,755 days; semi-major axis of 38.06 AU). Its orbit has an eccentricity of 0.04 and an inclination of 5° with respect to the ecliptic.  the object is at 37.2 AU, approaching the Sun until 15 July 2065, when it will come to perihelion. The body's observation arc begins at Kitt Peak in September 1998, just eight nights prior to its official discovery observation.

As a cubewano, also known as classical Kuiper belt object,  is located in between the resonant plutino and twotino populations and has a low-eccentricity orbit. It belongs to the cold population, distinct from the "stirred" hot population with inclinations higher than 5°. In a previous publication, the object was originally classified as a plutino.

Numbering and naming 

This minor planet was numbered by the Minor Planet Center on 27 February 2002 and received the number  in the minor planet catalog. , it has not been named. Acoording to the established naming conventions, it will receive a mythological or mythic name (not necessarily from Classical mythology), in particular one associated with creation.

Physical characteristics 

 has a blue-grey color (BB), with various color indices measured, giving a difference between the blue and red filter magnitude (BR) of 1.123 and 1.13, respectively.

Rotation period 

Lightcurve analysis gave an ambiguous rotation period of 8.84 hours with a brightness amplitude of 0.16 magnitude. An alternative period of 8.70 hours is also possible.

Diameter and albedo 

According to observations by the space-based Herschel and Spitzer telescopes,  measures between 393 and 460 kilometers and its surface has a low albedo between 0.043 and 0.060. While Johnston's Archive adopts a diameter of 393 kilometers, astronomer Michael Brown gives a radiometric diameter of 473 kilometers and lists this object as a "probable" dwarf planet (400–500 km), which is the category with the second lowest certainty in his 5-class taxonomic system. The Collaborative Asteroid Lightcurve Link assumes an albedo of 0.10 and calculates a diameter of 334 kilometers based on an absolute magnitude of 5.5. A generic magnitude-to-diameter conversion with an albedo of 0.9 gives a diameter of 352 kilometers.

Notes

References

External links 
 Asteroid Lightcurve Database (LCDB), query form (info )
 The Deep Ecliptic Survey Object Classifications
 MPEC 2006-X45 : DISTANT MINOR PLANETS (2006 DEC. 21.0 TT), Minor Planet Electronic Circular
 List of Transneptunian Objects, Minor Planet Center
 Discovery Circumstances: Numbered Minor Planets (35001)-(40000) – Minor Planet Center
 
 

035671
Discoveries by Arianna E. Gleason
035671
19980923